Daegu Baseball Stadium is a multi-use stadium in Daegu, South Korea. It is currently used mostly for baseball games and was the home stadium of Samsung Lions between 1982 and 2015. The stadium was built in 1948.

1948 establishments in South Korea
Baseball venues in South Korea
Multi-purpose stadiums in South Korea
Samsung Lions
Sports venues completed in 1948
Sports venues in Daegu
20th-century architecture in South Korea